The 2020 1. divisjon was the 36th season of the 1. divisjon, the second-tier Norwegian women's football division, and the 19th season under the current format.
The season started on 11 July 2020 and ended on 22 November 2020

Stabæk won the league and were thus promoted to the Toppserien.

Due to the COVID-19 pandemic, the season's starting date was delayed and the format changed, there will be no play-offs this season.
Starting from 2021 the league will assume a new format.

Format
The teams were reduced from 12 teams to 10 as four teams relegated from the previous season, Grand Bodø were relegated after losing to KIL/Hemne at the relegation play-offs. In addition, Stabæk and Fart were relegated from the 2019 Toppserien.
The winner will be promoted to the 2021 Toppserien automatically while the second placed team will enter a play-off with the 2020 Toppserien best relegating team, there would be no relegation this season.

League table

Results

Promotion play-offs
The league's runners-up, Medkila, faced Kolbotn, the 9th placed team in the 2020 Toppserien, in a two-legged play-off to decide who will play in the 2021 Toppserien.

1st leg

2nd leg

Kolbotn won 6–2 on aggregate.

Statistics

Top scorers

References

External links
Norges Fotballforbund 

2020
2
Norway
Norway
divisjon (women)